Cue sports for the 2017 Asian Indoor and Martial Arts Games in Ashgabat, Turkmenistan was held at the Ashgabat Billiard Sports Arena. It took place from 19 to 26 September 2017.

Medalists

Men

Women

Medal table

Results

Men

Three-cushion singles

English billiards singles

Nine-ball singles

Nine-ball doubles

Russian pyramid free singles

Russian pyramid dynamic singles

Russian pyramid combined singles

Snooker singles

Snooker team

Six-red snooker singles

Women

Nine-ball singles

Ten-ball singles

Six-red snooker singles

References

External links
 

Asian Indoor and Martial Arts Games
Asian Indoor and Martial Arts Games
2017
2017 Asian Indoor and Martial Arts Games events